Denistone is a suburb in Northern Sydney, in the state of New South Wales, Australia. Denistone is located 16 kilometres north-west of the Sydney central business district in the local government area of the City of Ryde. Denistone West and Denistone East are separate suburbs.

History
Denistone is derived from the name of a home built in the area called Dennistone.

The Wallumedegal Aboriginal tribe lived in the area between the Lane Cove River and Parramatta River, which was known as Walumetta. Gregory Blaxland, a free settler, purchased the  Brush Farm estate in 1806, shortly after his arrival in the colony. This estate covered most of the area south from Terry Road to Victoria Road and Tramway Street, and east from Brush Road to Shaftsbury Road. In 1829 Blaxland transferred Brush Farm Estate to his eldest daughter, Elizabeth, and her husband Dr Thomas Forster. Denistone was named after Forster's home "Dennistone", burnt down by bushfires in 1855. Richard Rouse Terry acquired the land from the Blaxlands in 1872 where he rebuilt Denistone House, now within the grounds of Ryde Hospital. The Denistone estate, centered on Denistone House, was a late subdivision, not opened up for sale until 1913. Another historic house in Denistone is The Hermitage which was built by Gregory Blaxland's son, John Blaxland in about 1842.

Heritage listings 
Denistone has a number of heritage-listed sites, including:
 1-13 Pennant Avenue: The Hermitage

Transport
Denistone railway station is on the Main Northern railway line of the Sydney Trains network. Denistone is predominantly residential, free of an expedient commercial hub. Its centre is considered to be the railway station, which was built in 1937, extending to Darvall Park.

Politics
Denistone sits in the state electorate of Ryde whose member is Victor Dominello, and the Federal electorate of Bennelong whose member is Jerome Laxale.

Parks

Darvall Park is a forest reserve near the railway line at Denistone. Flora includes Sydney blue gum, red olive berry, orange bark, waddy wood and forest nightshade. Despite over thirty years of bush regeneration, large areas of Darvall Park are heavily infested with weeds. Privet, Chinese privet, lantana, Madeira vine, taro and trad. The ringtail possum, Australian king parrot and satin bowerbird are sometimes seen here.

Demographics

Population
At the 2016 census, there were 3,751 residents in Denistone.  58.4% of people were born in Australia. The next most common countries of birth were China 12.8% and South Korea 4.2%. 56.2% of people spoke only English at home. Other languages spoken at home included Mandarin 13.3%, Cantonese 8.2% and Korean 5.4%. The most common responses for religion in were No Religion, so described 31.9%, Catholic 27.5%, Anglican 10.6% Of occupied private dwellings, 83.6% were separate houses and 15.7% were semi-detached,.

Income
Median weekly household income is $2,333.

Notable people
Arthur Beetson, renown as one of the greatest Australian Rugby league players of all time used to live in Denistone.

References

External links

 [CC-By-SA]

 
Suburbs of Sydney
City of Ryde